Hello, Welcome to Bubbletown's Happy Zoo is a live performance video by The Pillows released onto VHS and DVD. As well as featuring a live performance, it includes commentary by The Pillows in between songs and the music video for their single "Hybrid Rainbow". This is the first video officially released by the Pillows.

Track listing 
 "Like a Lovesong (Back to Back)"
 "One Life"
 "Stalker"
 "Strange Chameleon"
 "Swanky Street"
 "I Want to Be Sullivan"
 "Little Busters"
 "Hybrid Rainbow" (music video)

The Pillows video albums
1998 video albums
Live video albums
1998 live albums